Les Sœurs fâcher ('The Angry Sisters'), distributed in English as Me and My Sister, is a 2004 French comedy film directed by Alexandra Leclère and starring Isabelle Huppert.

Cast
 Isabelle Huppert as Martine Demouthy
 Catherine Frot as Louise Mollet
 François Berléand as Pierre Demouthy
 Brigitte Catillon as Sophie
 Michel Vuillermoz as Richard
 Christiane Millet as Géraldine
 Rose Thiéry as Fernanda, la bonne
 Bruno Chiche as Charles
 Antoine Beaufils as Alexandre Demouthy
 Jean-Philippe Puymartin as The editor
 Aurore Auteuil as The hostess

References

External links

2004 films
French comedy films
2000s French-language films
2004 comedy films
Pan-Européenne films
Films scored by Philippe Sarde
Films about sisters
2000s French films